Group A of the 2017 Africa Cup of Nations qualification tournament was one of the thirteen groups to decide the teams which qualified for the 2017 Africa Cup of Nations finals tournament. The group consisted of four teams: Tunisia, Togo, Liberia, and Djibouti.

The teams played against each other home-and-away in a round-robin format, between June 2015 and September 2016.

Tunisia, the group winners, qualified for the 2017 Africa Cup of Nations, while group runners-up Togo also qualified due to being one of the two group runners-up with the best records.

Standings

Matches

Goalscorers
5 goals

 William Jebor

3 goals

 Yassine Chikhaoui

2 goals

 Anthony Laffor
 Komlan Agbégniadan
 Floyd Ayité
 Kodjo Fo-Doh Laba
 Saber Khalifa
 Taha Yassine Khenissi

1 goal

 Mohamed Liban
 Francis Doe
 Gizzie Dorbor
 Sam Johnson
 Mark Paye
 Emmanuel Adebayor
 Serge Akakpo
 Sadat Ouro-Akoriko
 Vincent Bossou
 Mathieu Dossevi
 Fakhreddine Ben Youssef
 Maher Hannachi
 Hamdi Harbaoui
 Wahbi Khazri
 Hamza Lahmar
 Youssef Msakni
 Ferjani Sassi
 Naïm Sliti
 Yoann Touzghar

Notes

References

External links
Orange Africa Cup Of Nations Qualifiers 2017, CAFonline.com

Group A